La Fin de la Chrétienté (The End of the Christian World) is a 2021 book by philosopher Chantal Delsol that portends a return to paganism after centuries of Christendom. It is published in French by Éditions du Cerf.

Bibliography

External links 
 

2021 non-fiction books
French-language books
Books about Christianity
Books about paganism
Philosophy books
French non-fiction books